KUTN (96.7 FM, "Flashback 96.7") is a radio station broadcasting a classic hits format. Licensed to Levan, Utah, United States, the station serves the Levan area. The station is owned by a Utah County-based company called Sanpete County Broadcasting Company.

KUTN has a sister station known as KIXR.

History
The station was assigned the call sign KBLN on January 8, 1999. On January 25, 2001, the station changed its call sign to KCFM and on September 21, 2005, to KQMB; the radio station's name was Star 96.7.

KQMB picked up the callsign and format from 102.7, which is now known as KSL (radio network) KSL-FM.

In 2014, the station lost its signal and in 2017, the station went dark.

On December 20, 2018, Zeta Holdings, LLC sold the silent station, its booster signal in Provo, and translator K244DH Fort Douglas for $100,000 to Lucky Dog Broadcasting owned by Franklyn H. & Melanie Mueller. The sale was consummated on May 21, 2019. In 2020, the license for the booster signal in Provo was cancelled. The station returned to air on January 29, 2021. Originally, soft hits was aired on KKUT-HD4 Mount Pleasant for awhile. On April 17, 2021, KQMB flipped to a soft adult contemporary format branded as Kosy 96.7, and the soft hits was moved from KKUT-HD4 Mount Pleasant to KKUT-HD3 Mount Pleasant. As of November 16, 2021, KWLO 1580 and its FM translator on 99.9 began broadcasting a repeating audio message telling listeners that "Utah's Goat" had moved to 96.7 FM. KQMB flipped to a classic hit format branded as Utah's Goat 96.7, and the classic hits is now heard on KKUT-HD3 Mount Pleasant. Lucky Dog Broadcasting had been leasing the 1580 and 99.9 frequencies from owner RAMS III under a local marketing agreement (LMA), and due to the Covid-19 pandemic, Lucky Dog was unable to consummate the sale of KWLO and its associated translator. The new owner of 1580 and 99.9 was scheduled to take over operations of those frequencies beginning December 1, 2021. However, the transfer of station ownership was delayed by several months. Programming from Iglesia Pentecostal Vispera Del Fin began airing on KWLO on April 13, 2022.

On March 31, 2022, it was announced that Sanpete County Broadcasting Company had filed with the FCC to purchase KQMB, KSRR, and translator K244DH from Frank Mueller's Lucky Dog Broadcasting for $170,000. On August 31, 2022, the sale of KSRR, KQMB, and K244DH from Lucky Dog Broadcasting to Sanpete County Broadcasting was consummated with the FCC.On October 6, 2022, Sanpete County Broadcasting filed an application with the FCC to change the KSRR call sign to KIXR. The change was approved on October 27, 2022. On October 13, 2022, KQMB was granted a "license to cover" by the FCC. On November 2, 2022, Sanpete County Broadcasting submitted a request to the FCC to change KQMB's call sign to KUTN. The change was approved by the FCC on November 9, 2022. On November 7, 2022, Utah's Goat changed its branding to "Flashback 96.7", and streaming was discontinued. The station is presently only available over the air.

References

External links

UTN
Radio stations established in 2002
2002 establishments in Utah
Classic hits radio stations in the United States